Richard Bracewell (born 28 November 1969) is an English film director best known for directing 2015 British comedy feature film Bill, which he also developed with writers Laurence Rickard and Ben Willbond
. Bill was Bracewell's third feature film following The Gigolos and Cuckoo.

All three films were produced by UK feature film production company Punk Cinema, which Bracewell set up in 2004 with co-producer and brother Tony Bracewell.

Early life and career
Bracewell was born in London and was educated at Aylesbury Grammar School and New College, Oxford where he directed, co-wrote and performed in the Oxford Revue in 1991.

Initially Bracewell made short films with writers such as David Wolstencroft and performers such as Al Murray and directed UK TV comedy including some of Ali G's external segments for The 11 O'Clock Show. Before directing feature films, he also worked as a cinema usher at the Clapham Picture House in London.

The Gigolos
Bracewell's debut movie The Gigolos (2007) stars Susannah York, Anna Massey and Siân Phillips alongside newcomers Sacha Tarter and Trevor Sather. Bracewell wrote the film with Tarter and Sather, and directed and produced the film in London (UK) in 2005. He was also cinematographer on the film. The Gigolos had a limited film release by Punk Cinema on 23 March 2007. The British Film Institute released The Gigolos on DVD in the UK on 9 February 2009. First shown in competition at the American Film Institute Los Angeles International Film Festival (AFI FEST) in November 2005, Bracewell attended as one of the New Faces in European Cinema. The film was favourably reviewed by the Los Angeles Timesas "a subtly delightful film".

On its UK release, reviews appeared in major UK newspapers. Sukhdev Sandhu of The Daily Telegraph said that Bracewell "evokes with poetic clarity the loneliness of late-night London." Ian Johns in The Times wrote that "intimate camerawork and scenes moodily capture half-revealed lives". Larushka Ivan-Zadeh in Metro told readers to "seek out this cliché-confounding, utterly intriguing debut Brit flick", adding that this The Gigolos is a "real rough gem". Mike McCahill wrote in The Sunday Telegraph that this is "a disarming debut...that subverts your every expectation with each new scene."

In 2010, the Daily Telegraph listed The Gigolos as "the most underrated film of all time".

Cuckoo

Cuckoo was Bracewell's second feature, starring Richard E. Grant, Laura Fraser and Tamsin Greig. The film was shot in December 2007 and January 2008 in London and Norwich, and in a studio built in a disused grain warehouse in Yarmouth. Cuckoo is a thriller about sound and lies. It co-stars Antonia Bernath and Adam F. Bracewell wrote and directed the film, and produced with Tony Bracewell.

Cuckoo was premiered in September 2009 at the Cambridge Film Festival, where Clive James called the film "masterly and thrilling", and was released in UK cinemas by Verve Pictures in December 2010.

On UK cinema release David Edwards wrote in a four-star Daily Mirror review, that the film was "an unsettling, unconventional ... quite unlike anything our film industry is pumping out these days", adding that "Fraser is superb as a woman who just might be on the verge of a nervous breakdown".

Bill
In 2010 Bracewell met actors and writers Laurence Rickard and Ben Willbond after his daughter showed him sketches from the award-winning CBBC programme Horrible Histories. Bracewell had directed Willbond previously in The Gigolos. Together, Bracewell, Rickard and Willbond devised an original idea for a comedy about the origins of William Shakespeare, based around the years between 1585 and 1592 known as Shakespeare's "lost years". Subsequently, in 2011 BBC Films commissioned Punk Cinema to develop a screenplay for Bill based on the idea.

BBC Films announced Bill on 13 May 2013, as a co-production with fellow UK production companies Punk Cinema and Cowboy Films. Head of BBC Films Christine Langan said that "we’re thrilled [to be] making the first film starring this team of incredibly talented and popular British comedy writers and performers." In November of the same year ScreenDaily.com reported that the BFI (British Film Institute) Film Fund had invested £1 million in the production, with further undisclosed amounts coming from BBC Films, LipSync and Screen Yorkshire, through its Yorkshire Content Fund.

Bracewell directed Bill and produced with Tony Bracewell, Charles Steel and Aly Flind. Principal filming began on 10 February 2014 at locations around Yorkshire, including York Minster, Skipton Castle, Marske-by-the-Sea, Bolton Castle and Selby Abbey. Other filming locations included Stowe School, Caroline Gardens Chapel in Peckham, London, and Weald and Downland Open Air Museum in West Sussex. The closing scenes were filmed at Shakespeare's Globe, a modern recreation of the theatre where many of Shakespeare's plays were first performed.

Bill was released in UK cinemas on 18 September 2015 by Vertigo Films and on DVD and digital download in the UK by NBCUniversal on 15 February 2016.  Bill has also been released in cinemas in the United States and Australia.

The film received many positive press reviews and currently scores 94% on Rotten Tomatoes Nigel Andrews wrote in the Financial Times that "This is a comedy. And a puckish, inventive, funny one." In his review in The Guardian, Peter Bradshaw wrote: "Big laughs... There are hints of the Carry Ons, Blackadder and especially Python, with one gag that must surely be a specific homage to Holy Grail."

In an interview with Den of Geek for the DVD release in February 2016, Bracewell talked about the development, production and release of Bill: "It generated a huge amount of loyalty and warmth. Chris Addison was nothing to do with the production, and he's tweeted about it several times. Paddy Considine did too. Even James Corden all the way over in LA! We get nothing but terrific feedback from fans on Twitter and Facebook. And not just in the UK, but in Australia and from other territories really keen to see it. We didn't do a red carpet, we just did a friends and family screening on the eve of its release. I even bought drinks at my own premiere! It's generated warmth but I think – are we allowed to say things like it's a peculiarly British film? It feels different? It's a little bit quirky? It's got an intentional DIY feel to it? It's meant to be like that. I think maybe that's something people have picked up on. Superhero films aren't so much our cultural history, but we do that kind of comedy really well. I hope that what we've done is something that's wearing its learning on its sleeve. We do know there's a bit of Python in it, we do know there's a bit of Blackadder, but so what? There's Star Wars'' in there too, because we love those movies."

In 2016, Bracewell was nominated with Rickard and Willbond for the Award for Comedy at the Evening Standard British Film Awards.

References

External links
 Official site for The Gigolos
 
 Punk Cinema
 Interview with Richard Bracewell Part 1
 Interview with Richard Bracewell Part 2
 Alex McRae, The Independent, "I Want Your Job: Film Director" 2006-06-01
 BBC Film Network interview with Richard Bracewell
 Cuckoo official site

English film directors
Living people
1969 births
Alumni of New College, Oxford